FC Tekstilshchik Ivanovo is a Russian association football club based in the city of Ivanovo, playing in the third-tier Russian Football National League 2. It enjoyed Soviet and Russian football league systems' second tier membership in 1939, 1945 to 1962, 1965 to 1974, 1983, 1992, 1993, 2007 and from 2019 to 2022.

Team name history
1937–1938 Spartak Ivanovo
1939–1943 Osnova Ivanovo
1944–1946 Dynamo Ivanovo
1947–1957 Krasnoye Znamya Ivanovo
1958–1998 Tekstilshchik Ivanovo
1999–2000 FC Ivanovo
2001–2003 Tekstilshchik Ivanovo
2004–2007 Tekstilshchik-Telekom Ivanovo (FC Spartak-Telekom Shuya merged with Tekstilschik in 2004)
2008–present Tekstilshchik Ivanovo

Current squad
As of 22 February 2023, according to the Second League website.

Notable players
Abdou Jammeh was a Gambia international during his spell at Tekstilshchik.

References

External links
Official website 

 
Association football clubs established in 1937
Football clubs in Russia
Sport in Ivanovo
1937 establishments in Russia